Lake Fort Smith State Park is a  Arkansas state park in Crawford County, Arkansas in the United States. Originally a Fort Smith city park in the 1930s and later the Works Progress Administration–built Mountainburg Recreational Facility, the lake nestled in the Boston Mountains was adopted into the state park system by the Arkansas Department of Parks and Tourism in 1967. Lake Fort Smith State Park was closed in 2002 to make way for a larger dam and spillway. The addition flooded the site of the old park, and the new 260 acre Lake Fort Smith State Park reopened May 21, 2008 four miles north of its original location with 30 campsites, 10 cabins, a group lodging facility, picnic sites, a pavilion, marina with rental boats, a double lane boat ramp, a swimming pool, playground, and an 8,000 square foot visitor center with exhibit gallery, gift shop, a meeting/class room, a patio with an outdoor wood-burning fireplace, and an expansive view of the lake and mountains.

See also

References

Fort Smith
State parks of Arkansas
Protected areas of Crawford County, Arkansas
Protected areas established in 1967
1967 establishments in Arkansas
Protected areas established in 2008
Works Progress Administration in Arkansas
Bodies of water of Crawford County, Arkansas
Fort Smith
2002 disestablishments in Arkansas
2008 establishments in Arkansas